Spon may refer to:

Spiegel Online, the online version of German news magazine Der Spiegel
 The Old English term for a wooden roof tile or shingle made by a 'Sponner'. This tradename is the origin of the surname Spooner.
 An all-purpose nonsense word used in several episodes of The Goon Show, a radio comedy broadcast by the BBC between 1951 and 1960.  It might refer to a place, a disease, or an unpleasant substance.
 A district on the outskirts of the UK city of Coventry (Spon End), or the road leading to that district from the city centre (Spon Street).
 Spon Press, a publisher acquired by Taylor & Francis

People with the surname
Jacob Spon (1647–1685), French doctor and archaeologist